Alberto Cecchi (born 13 September 1943) is an Italian rower. He competed in the men's coxed four event at the 1972 Summer Olympics.

References

External links
 
 

1943 births
Living people
Italian male rowers
Olympic rowers of Italy
Rowers at the 1972 Summer Olympics
Place of birth missing (living people)